Goldfish Memory is a 2003 feature film about everyday relationships, set and filmed in Dublin. It was written and directed by Elizabeth Gill.

Plot
The movie is set around a small group of characters experiencing relationships which build and crumble before the viewers' eyes. The title of the film refers to the belief, expressed by several of characters, that the goldfish retains a memory of something for only three seconds. Tom, one of the principal characters in the film, draws comparisons between this and the human tendency to jump from one relationship to the next, "forgetting" the pain that any previous one might have caused. The film shows complexities involved in straight, gay, lesbian, and bisexual relationships. Writer/director Liz Gill says the film was influenced by the work of directors Robert Altman and Richard Linklater, particularly Linklater's film Slacker.

Cast
 Sean Campion as Tom
 Fiona O'Shaughnessy as Clara
 Fiona Glascott as Isolde
 Peter Gaynor as David
 Keith McErlean as Red
 Stuart Graham as Larry
 Lise Hearns as Rosie
 Jean Butler as Renee
 Justine Mitchell as Kate
 Aisling O'Neill as Helen
 Demien McAdam as Conzo
 Flora Montgomery as Angie
 Joe Keever as Eddie the Cameraman
 Britta Smith as Mrs. Devine
 Niall O'Brien as Taxi Driver

Soundtrack
The film's soundtrack acted as something of a showcase for the Irish alternative music scene of the time. Alongside relatively established bands like The Frames and The Walls, it also featured up and coming acts like Rodrigo y Gabriela, Nina Hynes and Messiah J and the Expert.

Four songs by the legendary Brazilian Bossa Nova composer Tom Jobim were remade for the movie, three of which ('Once I Loved', 'Waters of March' and 'Desafinado') were performed by Damien Rice with Lisa Hannigan (vocals) and Vyvienne Long (cello). The other ('Lamento No Morro') was performed by Richie Buckley.

Critical reaction
Peter Bradshaw, writing in The Guardian, described Goldfish Memory as a "forgettable" and "vapid relationship comedy, reminiscent of the sponsorship ads that wrap around the commercials during TV's Friends".

See also 

 List of LGBT-related films directed by women

References

External links
 
 Goldfish Memory at Shot at Trinity (database of films shot at Trinity College Dublin)

2003 films
2003 drama films
Bisexuality-related films
English-language Irish films
Films set in Dublin (city)
Irish independent films
Irish LGBT-related films
Lesbian-related films
LGBT-related drama films
2003 LGBT-related films
2000s English-language films